Juan Pablo González (born August 13, 1984) is a Mexican film director, screenwriter and editor known for his 2018 film Caballerango, and the 2022 Sundance award winner Dos Estaciones. His work primarily focuses on the Los Altos region of Mexico, where he's from. 

In 2015 González was named one of the "25 New Faces of Independent Film" by Filmmaker Magazine. The following year, his one-take short Las Nubes premiered at Havana and at the 2017 International Film Festival Rotterdam.  

In 2018, his critically acclaimed mid-length documentary Caballerango premiered at the International Documentary Festival Amsterdam (IDFA).

He is currently the co-director of film at the California Institute of the Arts (CalArts). In 2020 he won the Vilcek Prize for Creative Promise in Filmmaking.

References

Mexican film directors
1984 births
California Institute of the Arts faculty
Living people